The 47th Virginia Cavalry Battalion was a cavalry battalion raised in Virginia for service in the Confederate States Army during the American Civil War. It fought mostly in western Virginia and the Shenandoah Valley.

Virginia's 47th Cavalry Battalion was organized in April, 1864, with four companies. It was assigned to W.L. Jackson's Brigade and skirmished in western Virginia and the Shenandoah Valley. During December the unit merged into the 26th Virginia Cavalry Regiment. Major William N. Harman was in command.

See also

List of Virginia Civil War units

References

Units and formations of the Confederate States Army from Virginia
1864 establishments in Virginia
Military units and formations established in 1864
1865 disestablishments in Virginia
Military units and formations disestablished in 1865